The Macedonian Academy of Sciences and Arts is an academic institution in North Macedonia.

History
The Academy of Sciences and Arts was established by the Socialist Republic of Macedonia's assembly on 23 February 1967 as the highest scientific, scholarly and artistic institution in the country with the aim of monitoring and stimulating the sciences and arts. The Academy's objectives are to survey the cultural heritage and natural resources, to assist in the planning of a national policy regarding the sciences and arts, to stimulate, co-ordinate, organize and conduct scientific and scholarly research and to promote artistic achievement, especially where particularly relevant to North Macedonia. The Academy facilitates scholarly, scientific and artistic endeavors on the part of its members. It also works on developing international co-operation in the fields of the sciences and arts.

As an independent scientific and artistic institution the Academy achieves these objectives by basic, developmental and applied research, comprehensive and interdisciplinary research projects, by organizing scientific and scholarly conferences and symposia, publishing the results of the same and of other scientific research and organizing events in the field of the arts. The Academy collaborates with the universities, other scientific, scholarly and cultural institutions, scientific and artistic societies and other comparable organizations in North Macedonia. It also co-operates with other academies of sciences and arts, and with scientific, scholarly and artistic institutions abroad.

Structure
The Academy's supreme body is the Assembly of all of its members. The Assembly is in charge of passing the statutory regulations regarding the organisation and general activities of the Academy such as its statute, financial plan, the establishment of departments and scientific, scholarly and artistic units, etc. The Assembly elects the President, Vice-President and Secretary of the Academy as well as a number of the members of the Presidency.

It also elects full, foreign and honorary members of the Academy. The election of members takes place every three years by a majority vote in a secret ballot of the Academy's full members. The members are independent in their scientific and scholarly research and artistic work and are elected for life. The organisational structure of the Academy includes the Presidency, five departments, five research centres, two technical units and the Academy's Secretariat.

Controversies

The Macedonian Encyclopedia was the only scientific encyclopedia of North Macedonia issued in 2009 by MANU. The issuance of the encyclopedia caused a serious protest due to its content, and its authors have been subjected to severe criticism. Such reactions arose in the neighboring Greece, Bulgaria, Kosovo and Albania. It was urgently withdrawn. The reason behind this was political pressure from US and UK diplomats.

In February 2021 the members of the MANU requested that the recent Law proposal for the inclusion of the phrase “North Macedonia” as part of the institution’s name has to be withdrawn. Though, the Macedonian Parliament has agreed. Harsh criticism of the bilateral agreements signed with Bulgaria and Greece there has indicated that this national institution isn't under the direct influence of the government. The head of MANU Ljupčo Kocarev has called the Prespa Agreement a factor of regional destabilization and the agreement with Bulgaria “demeaning” to the ethnic Macedonians.The majority of academicians and the presidency of the Academy could not accept the change of the name of MANU (abv. for "Macedonian Academy of Sciences and Arts") into embarrassing or shameful "ANUSM" (abv. for "Akademija na Naukite i Umetnostite na Severna Makedonija" (in Macedonian language)), so their decision was not to abide with the provisions of the Prespa Agreement and hence the presidency of the Academy rejected directive of the Government to comply with the treaty.

Gallery

See also
Macedonian Encyclopedia - published by the academy

References

External links

 Official website

Cultural organizations based in North Macedonia
National academies of sciences
National academies of arts and humanities
Science and technology in North Macedonia
1967 establishments in the Socialist Republic of Macedonia
Organizations established in 1967
Scientific organizations established in 1967
Members of the International Council for Science
Members of the International Science Council